Rostislav Ernstovich Goldstein (born 15 March 1969) is a Russian politician who is the Governor of the Jewish Autonomous Oblast since 2019, having served his first year in acting capacity. He is a member of the ruling United Russia party.

Early life 
Goldstein was born on March 15, 1969, in the Tver region of Russia. He spent his childhood in the island of Sakhalin. In 1986, he worked as a mechanic at the Sakhalin State District Power Plant. From 1987 to 1989, he served in the Russian Army, later returning to his previous job. 

In 1990 he got married. Since the beginning of the 1990s, together with his wife, he was engaged in private business. In 1995 he graduated from the Academy of Economics and Law (Ryazan) with a degree in Administrative Law and Economics. In 2001-2004, he was the general director of the Goldstein trading house.

Notes

References 

1969 births
Living people
United Russia politicians
Governors of the Jewish Autonomous Oblast
Russian businesspeople
Acting heads of the federal subjects of Russia
Fifth convocation members of the State Duma (Russian Federation)
Sixth convocation members of the State Duma (Russian Federation)
Members of the Federation Council of Russia (after 2000)
People from Selizharovsky District